Mathoura  is a small town in the Riverina region of southern New South Wales, Australia, in the Murray River Council local government area. The town's name is derived from an aboriginal word for 'windy'.

History
In 1848 a reserve was established on Gulpa Creek by Surveyor Townsend.  The locality became known as Redbank.  By 1853 W. Moore Carter had established an inn at Redbank and in 1856 he was permitted to purchase  at £2 10s. per acre.  By 1860 Carter had about  under cultivation, including a  vineyard.

A petition in 1859 called on the Government to put up the reserve at Redbank for sale.  However, there were others who considered a more suitable position for a village was at Hill Plain, where Mr. Stuckey had erected an inn (opened in June 1860 and managed by John Atkinson).

In 1860 Surveyor McCulloch laid out the township of Redbank near the site of Carter's Redbank Inn.  In 1864 Carter was growing tobacco at Redbank (from which cigars were manufactured).

A traveller passing through Redbank in mid-1865 stated that "Mr. Carter has established a brick public-house… situated on the bank of the Gulpa Creek".   The writer added: "I observed three or four acres fenced and stocked with fruit trees, withered and dried up".

In 1865 Henry Burton, a circus proprietor, purchased the Redbank Inn; he held the licence until at least 1870.

Mathoura Post Office opened on 1 September 1867.

The village was made a stopping-place on the Victorian railway line that was extended into New South Wales to Deniliquin.   By 1879 it was reported that the village had about six houses of "straggling order" and was supported principally by the timber trade.  By 1882 a flour mill had been established at Mathoura; there were two hotels, the Mathoura Inn and the Railway Hotel, as well as a school, a Union church and a sawmill.

Climate

Today
The town has an Australian Rules football team competing in the Picola & District Football League.

Golfers play at the course of the Mathoura Golf Club on the Cobb Highway.

See also
 Mathoura Football Club

References

External links 

 Mathoura Rail Siding 

Towns in the Riverina
Towns in New South Wales
1860 establishments in Australia
Murray River Council